Belkuchi Bohumukhi Mohila College is a largest women's college of Belkuchi, Sirajgonj.

History 
Former Minister Latif Biswas founder of Belkuchi Multipurpose Women's College. This college is the only institution for the women of The Belkuchi upazila. There are classes in classes XI - XII. And here various disciplines in Aranas and Degrees. It is about 5 meters from the Belkuchi bus Strip. It is located next to the Al-Aman Bahela Khatun Mosque.

Category summary 

 'Higher Secondary Level' 
 Science branch
 Human branch
 Business Education Branch

 'Degree level' 
 B.A. (Pass),
 BSS (Pass),
 BBS (pass),
 B.Sc. (Pass),

See also
 Baniaganti S. N. Academy School And College

References

External links
 Education Board Rajshahi 
 Education Boards of Bangladesh
 Directorate of Secondary and Higher Education in Bangladesh

Education in Sirajgonj